Robert Costa Ventura (born 6 June 1994) is a Spanish footballer who plays for CF Lorca Deportiva as a central defender.

Club career
Born in Girona, Catalonia, Costa joined FC Barcelona's youth system in 2006, aged 12. In June 2013 he was promoted to the reserves in Segunda División, but was loaned to CF Badalona in Segunda División B on 16 August.

Costa appeared in 14 matches during the 2013–14 campaign, and subsequently returned to Barça in June 2014. On 7 September he played his first match as a professional, starting in a 4–1 home routing over Real Zaragoza.

Career statistics

Club

References

External links
 
 
 

1994 births
Living people
Sportspeople from Girona
Spanish footballers
Footballers from Catalonia
Association football defenders
Segunda División players
Segunda División B players
FC Barcelona Atlètic players
CF Badalona players
Celta de Vigo B players
Atlético Levante UD players
Lleida Esportiu footballers
CF Lorca Deportiva players